Herbert Croft may refer to:

Herbert Croft (bishop) (1603–1691), English churchman
Sir Herbert Croft, 1st Baronet (c. 1651–1720), English Member of Parliament
Sir Herbert Croft, 5th Baronet (1751–1816), British author
Sir Herbert Croft, 9th Baronet (1838–1902), British Member of Parliament
Sir Herbert Croft, 10th Baronet (1868–1915), of the Croft baronets
Sir Herbert Croft (died 1629) (1565–1629), English politician who sat in the House of Commons at various times between 1589 and 1614